Collie O'Shea (born 19 January 1991) is an Irish rugby union player. His plays as a centre and played club rugby for Clontarf.

Leinster
On 9 February 2012, O'Shea made his competitive debut for Leinster, starting against Benetton Treviso in a 2011–12 Pro12 fixture.

Munster
In August 2016, O'Shea joined Munster on a three-month contract.

References

External links
Munster Profile
Leinster Profile

1991 births
Living people
Rugby union players from Dublin (city)
Irish rugby union players
Leinster Rugby players
Munster Rugby players
Clontarf FC players
Rugby union centres
People educated at Belvedere College